"One More Night" is the first single in the United States and second in the United Kingdom from Phil Collins' third album, the Diamond-certified No Jacket Required. "One More Night" was Phil Collins' second U.S. No. 1 single, following "Against All Odds", and was his fourth single to reach the top ten in the UK, peaking at No. 4 on the UK Singles Chart. In the U.S., the single entered the Billboard Hot 100 at number 50 on the chart dated February 9, 1985. It hit number one seven weeks later and remained on top for two weeks. In the UK, the single was certified silver by the British Phonographic Industry. It was also his first No. 1 on the U.S. Adult contemporary chart.

The soft rock ballad remained for two weeks at the top in the U.S. in early 1985, until it was surpassed by "We Are the World" by USA for Africa on 13 April 1985. It has also been included on the compilation albums Hits (1998), The Platinum Collection (2004), Love Songs: A Compilation... Old and New (2004) and The Singles (2016).

It was also released on the 2008 EMI TV compilation album, 101 Love Songs, with Against All Odds (Take A Look At Me Now).

History
Collins was playing around with his drum machine (a Roland TR-808) when he started saying the chorus of the song. He later recalled that the writing of the song, which has no hook, was completed "very quickly." Its B-side in the UK was "I Like the Way", while the US received "The Man with the Horn".

Music video
The song's music video, directed by Jim Yukich, features Collins playing the piano in a downtown bar. It was filmed at a pub owned by Richard Branson in London (the same club used for the "Sussudio" video, but looking different because the bar is now closed and this clip is shot in sepia tone, while "Sussudio" was full-colored).  This video is in fact a segue from the music video for "Sussudio", the full version of both clips without a break was included in Phil Collins' long-form music video release "The Singles Collection".

Phil's guitarist Daryl Stuermer makes an appearance, as does Phenix Horns member Don Myrick, who plays the sax solo which closes the tune.

Critical reception
Robert Hilburn of the Los Angeles Times originally disliked the song "One More Night", but later praised it, saying that "Collins' soulful but polite vocal style is also capable of capturing the pain of going through yet one more night without her". Isaac Guzman of the New York Daily News said that the song brought about "snuggle-inspiring tenderness".

However, Keegan Hamilton of the Riverfront Times said that the song was the worst track on the album, saying that "The album's introspective slow jam wallows in self-pity." "It's minimalist, as far as the '80s go, relying mostly on a shaker, a crisp drum machine and echoing keyboards. It ends with a saxophone solo so smooth that I can't believe it's not butter," adds Keegan.

Cash Box said that the song is "gentle, free-flowing and touching and lives up to Collins’ usual high standards as a writer/producer/performer."

The song has also been an occasional cover song for ex-Veruca Salt frontwoman  Nina Gordon during live appearances. An extended version of the song appeared on the 12"ers album.

Track listing

7": Virgin / VS755 (UK)
"One More Night" (edit) – 4:25
"I Like the Way"

7": Atlantic / 7-89588 (U.S.)
"One More Night" (edit) – 4:25
"The Man with the Horn"

12": Virgin / VS755-12 (UK)
"One More Night" (Extended Mix) – 6:24
"I Like the Way"

CD: WEA International / WPCR 2064 (Japan)
"One More Night"
"I Like the Way"

Charts

Weekly Charts

Year-end charts

Certifications

Credits and personnel

Recording 
 Recorded at The Townhouse, London and Old Croft, Surrey

Personnel 
 Phil Collins – vocals, songwriter, producer, Roland TR-808, keyboards, backing vocals
 Hugh Padgham - producer
 Daryl Stuermer – guitars
 Leland Sklar – bass guitar 
 Don Myrick – alto saxophone solo
 Arif Mardin – string arrangements

See also
List of Hot 100 number-one singles of 1985 (U.S.)
List of number-one adult contemporary singles of 1985 (U.S.)

References

External links
Music video on YouTube

1984 songs
1985 singles
Phil Collins songs
Billboard Hot 100 number-one singles
Cashbox number-one singles
Songs written by Phil Collins
Atlantic Records singles
Virgin Records singles
1980s ballads
Rock ballads
RPM Top Singles number-one singles
Song recordings produced by Hugh Padgham
Song recordings produced by Phil Collins